The California Cup Classic is an American thoroughbred horse race run annually at Santa Anita Park in Arcadia, California during its Oak Tree Racing Association meet in the fall of the year. It is raced over a distance of 1⅛ miles on dirt and is open to horses three-year-olds and up bred in the state of California. The event currently offers a purse of $250,000 and a trophy.

The California Cup Classic is part of the "California Cup Day" series of races intended to call attention to, and to honor, the California Thoroughbred racing and breeding industry.

Past winners
 2014 California Chrome
 2013 Tiz a Mischief
 2012 - Lucky Primo (Tyler Baze)
 2011 - Norvsky (Rafael Bejarano)
 2010 - Soul Candy (Rafael Bejarano)
 2009 - Bold Chieftain (Russell Baze)
 2008 - Mr. Chairman (Michael Baze)
 2007 - Bold Chieftain (Russell Baze)
 2006 - Texcess
 2005 - McCann's Mojave
 2004 - Cozy Guy
 2003 - Tizbud 
 2002 - Calkins Road
 2001 - Irisheyesareflying
 2000 - Sky Jack
 1999 - Bagshot
 1998 - BudroyaleStraub-Rubens
 1997 - Awesome Daze
 1996 - Megan's Interco
 1995 - Luthier Fever
 1994 - College Town
 1993 - Best Pal
 1992 - June's Reward
 1991 - Charmonnier
 1990 - My Sonny Boy

References

 Oak Tree racing meet at Santa Anita
 The California Cup Classic at Pedigree Query.com

Horse races in California
Graded stakes races in the United States
Open mile category horse races
Racing series for horses